Daimler Double-Six may refer to either of two different series of Daimler V12 engines or to a car produced by Jaguar Cars under the Daimler nameplate.

Engines made 1926 to 1938

Daimler Double-Six Engine
 7.1-litre sleeve-valve 1926-1930
 3.7-litre sleeve-valve 1927-193?
 5.3-litre sleeve-valve 1930-1936
 6.5-litre sleeve-valve 1930-1936
 6.5-litre poppet valve 1937

Engines made 1972 to 1997

Daimler Double-Six Engine
 5.3-litre 1972-1981
 5.3-litre HE 1981-1992
 6.0-litre HE 1993-1997

Cars

Daimler Double-Six 1972-1997
Daimler Double-Six XJ81 1993-1994
Daimler Double-Six X305 1994-1997

Daimler vehicles
Daimler engines